Demetrida filiformis is a species of ground beetle in Lebiinae subfamily. It was described by Blackburn in 1893 and is found in Australia.

References

Beetles described in 1893
Beetles of Australia
filiformis